Events in the year 1848 in Belgium.

Incumbents
Monarch: Leopold I
Head of government: Charles Rogier

Events
 24 February – Belgium accedes to the 1841 Treaty for the Suppression of the African Slave Trade.
 4 March – Karl Marx deported from Belgium
 29 March – Risquons-Tout incident: Belgian troops disperse a revolutionary republican force entering the country from France.
 13 June – General election
 12 July - Provincial elections
 8 October – Convention with the French Second Republic and the Kingdom of Prussia regulating customs declarations on international rail services signed in Brussels.
 3 November – Postal convention with the United Kingdom of Great Britain and Ireland signed in Brussels.

Publications
Periodicals
 Annales de l'Académie Royale d'Archéologie de Belgique, 5
 Bulletin de l'Académie Royale de Médecine de Belgique, 7
 Journal d'horticulture pratique ou Guide des amateurs et jardiniers, 5 (Brussels, F. Parent)
 Pasicrisie belge: recueil général de la jurisprudence, 3rd series, part 1 (Brussels, Meline, Cans & co.)
 Revue belge de numismatique et de sigillographie, 4

Books
 Dystorie van Saladine, edited by Constant-Philippe Serrure (Ghent, Maetschappy der Vlaemsche Bibliophilen, 1848)
 Jean-Baptiste Malou, Recherches historiques et critiques sur le véritable auteur de l'Imitation de Jésus-Christ (Brussels, 1848).
 Charles Henri Marcellis, Considérations sur les révolutions de 1848, au point de vue belge (Brussels, Meline, Cans & co.)
 C. Poplimont, La Belgique depuis mil huit cent trente (Brussels and Leipzig, Mayer & Flatau)

Art and architecture

Paintings
 Louis Gallait, The Fisherman's Family
Sculpture
 Guillaume Geefs's Le génie du mal installed in Liège Cathedral 
 Eugène Simonis, Equestrian statue of Godrfey of Bouillon, Place Royale, Brussels

Births
 10 February – Anna Boch, painter (died 1936)
 25 April – Alphonse van Gèle, soldier (died 1939)
 14 June – Théophile Lybaert, artist (died 1927)
 22 June – Julien Liebaert, politician (died 1930)
 3 July – Marie Joseph Charles, 6th Duke d'Ursel, politician (died 1903)
 16 August – Marie de Villermont, writer (died 1925)
 7 October – Georges Croegaert, painter (died 1923)
 8 October – Pierre De Geyter, composer (died 1932)

Deaths
 23 March – Julien-Joseph Ducorron (born 1770), painter
 24 April – François van Campenhout (born 1779), opera singer and composer
 17 May – Jan Frans Eliaerts (born 1761), painter
 1 October – François-René Boussen (born 1774), bishop of Bruges

References

 
Belgium
Years of the 19th century in Belgium
1840s in Belgium
Belgium